Montesquieu (Languedocien: Senta Tecla de Montesquiu) is a commune in the Tarn-et-Garonne department in the Occitanie region in southern France.

Geography
On the commune's northern border, the Barguelonnette flows into the Barguelonne, which forms all of the commune's northern and northwestern borders.

See also
Communes of the Tarn-et-Garonne department

References

Communes of Tarn-et-Garonne